St. John in the Wilderness Church could refer to:

 St. John's in the Wilderness Episcopal Church (USA)
 St. John in the Wilderness Church (Dharamshala) (India)
 St. John in the Wilderness (Flat Rock, North Carolina) (USA)
 St. John in the Wilderness (Nainital) (India)